Pik Baikal is a mountain in the Barguzin Range, Buryatia, Russian Federation.
This peak is located to the east of the eastern shore of neighboring Lake Baikal.

Geography

Pik Baikal is an ultra prominent peak that rises in the eastern flank of the Barguzin Range. Administratively the peak is part of the Kurumkansky District of Buryatia. The Barguzin River flows below the eastern slopes of the mountain.

See also
List of mountains and hills of Russia
List of ultras of Northeast Asia

References

External links
Пик Байкал - Природа Бурятии
пик Байкал (Байкал Северный)
Турклуб «Вестра» - пик Байкал

Landforms of Buryatia
South Siberian Mountains